The Yellow River is a watercourse wholly in County Leitrim, Ireland. It is one of two rivers of this name in the county, the other originating at Doon, County Cavan.

Course 

The river forms from the confluence of several short source arms which originate in Slievenakilla townland, south of the Benbrack hill on the border to County Cavan. The townland of Slievenakilla is practically divided by the Yellow River which flows initially west, passes under the road between Ballinagleragh and Stralongford, turns north and follows an approximate WNW course until Sranagarvanagh townland where it turns towards the southwest. At Fahy the river discharges into Lough Allen, effectively becoming a tributary of the River Shannon.

Wildlife 

Lapwings  are customarily seen near the mouth of the Yellow River, also sandpipers and redshanks. Occasionally, little egrets have been observed, but did not breed.

See also 
Rivers of Ireland
Lough Allen

References

Rivers of County Leitrim